Neptis nina, the tiny sailer, is a butterfly in the family Nymphalidae. It is found in eastern Tanzania, south-eastern Kenya and north-eastern Zambia. The habitat consists of forests.

References

Butterflies described in 1896
nina
Butterflies of Africa
Taxa named by Otto Staudinger